Lucien Deiss,  was a French Catholic priest, biblical scholar, and liturgical composer, born in Eschbach, Bas-Rhin, on 2 September 1921, and died on 9 October 2007 at the age of 86.

Biography 
Deiss entered the Congregation of the Holy Ghost in 1942. Passionate about the Bible and liturgy, he was initially professor of Holy Scripture at the major seminary of Brazzaville, Congo. Returning to France for health reasons in 1948, he taught at the seminary of Chevilly-Larue, which later renamed its library in his honor.

Deiss composed over 400 pieces of liturgical music, many inspired by Gregorian chant and Renaissance polyphony with biblical texts. He once described the impetus for his composing career, starting in the 1950s: "I realized that the people knew almost nothing of the Bible, so I decided to try using music to help them memorize the more important texts." Beyond France, some of his works were widely translated and sold over 5 million copies. His Biblical Hymns and Psalms (1965) was one of the first major collections of new music for English-language Masses, responding to the liturgical reforms of the Second Vatican Council in which he participated, and earning him an honorary Doctorate in Sacred Music from Duquesne University.

Works

Musical compositions 
French:
 Souviens-toi de Jésus-Christ
 L'Esprit de Dieu
 Terre entière chante ta joie
 Un seul Seigneur
 Peuple de prêtres, peuple de rois

English:
 "All the Earth, Proclaim the Lord"
 "Grant to Us, O Lord"
 "Keep in Mind"
 "My Shepherd Is the Lord"
 "My Soul Is Longing for Your Peace"
 "With a Joyful Heart"

Books 
 La Prière chrétienne des psaumes. Desclée de Brouwer, 2001.
 Joseph, Marie, Jésus. Editions Saint Paul, 1997.
 La messe: sa célébration expliquée. Desclée de Brouwer, 1989.
 Come, Lord Jesus: Biblical Prayers with Psalms and Scripture Readings. World Library Publications, 1981.
 Biblical Hymns and Psalms. Multiple volumes and publishers, starting 1965.

References

External links 
 
 

Liturgists
Holy Ghost Fathers
1921 births
2007 deaths
20th-century French composers
21st-century French composers
French male composers
French composers of sacred music
20th-century French Roman Catholic priests
21st-century French Roman Catholic priests
20th-century French male musicians
21st-century French male musicians